Gerhard Pircher was an Austrian luger who competed in the early 1980s. A natural track luger, he won the gold medal in the men's singles event at the 1982 FIL World Luge Natural Track Championships at Feld am See, Austria.

References

External links
Natural track World Championships results: 1979-2007

Austrian male lugers
Living people
Year of birth missing (living people)